Bansulab-e Kalbali (also Romanized as Bānsūlāb-e Kalb‘alī and Bān Sūlāb-e Kalb‘alī; also known as Bān Sūleh-ye Kalb‘alī) is a village in Qalkhani Rural District, Gahvareh District, Dalahu County, Kermanshah Province, Iran. At the 2006 census, its population was 87, in 23 families.

References 

Populated places in Dalahu County